Enterococcus mundtii is a species of Enterococcus. Its genome has been sequenced. The type strain is NCDO 2375.

On the human body, Enterococcus mundtii can be commonly found in the navel.

References

Further reading
Epidemiology of Enterococcus:

External links

LPSN
Type strain of Enterococcus mundtii at BacDive -  the Bacterial Diversity Metadatabase

mundtii
Bacteria described in 1986